Kwezi Naledi Stadium is a multi-use stadium in Lady Grey, Eastern Cape, South Africa. It is currently used mostly for football matches and is the home ground of Mighty Greens F.C.

Sports venues in the Eastern Cape
Soccer venues in South Africa
Multi-purpose stadiums in South Africa